Richard Stephen Venes (12 March 1885 – 10 June 1959) was an English cricketer.  Venes was a right-handed batsman who bowled leg break googly.  He was born at Battersea, London.

Venes made four first-class appearances for Northamptonshire in the 1922 County Championship against Yorkshire, Derbyshire, Lancashire and in a second match against Yorkshire.  In his four first-class matches, he scored 8 runs at an average of 1.33, with a high score of 4 not out.  With the ball he took 4 wickets at a bowling average of 21.00, with best figures of 4/60.

He died at Northampton, Northamptonshire on 10 June 1959.

References

External links
Richard Venes at ESPNcricinfo
Richard Venes at CricketArchive

1885 births
1959 deaths
People from Battersea
Cricketers from Greater London
English cricketers
Northamptonshire cricketers